The Concrete City was an early example of International Style architecture in the United States, built as company housing in 1911 for select employees of the Delaware, Lackawana and Western Railroad's coal division in Nanticoke, Pennsylvania.  It was eventually taken over by the Glen Alden Coal Company who, uninterested in paying for required improvements and unable to demolish it due to its robust construction, abandoned the property in 1924.  It stands to this day, albeit in extreme disrepair. Currently, the site is commonly used by military, police, firefighters, airsoft military-simulation events and recreational paintball players for staged games.

In 1998, the Pennsylvania Historical and Museum Commission declared Concrete City a historic site.

External links
 The Concrete City - Web page showing recent photographs of the site, with a brief history
 Concrete City - Before and after (then and now)
 Google Maps of Concrete City

References 
 
 

History of Pennsylvania
Buildings and structures in Luzerne County, Pennsylvania
1911 establishments in Pennsylvania
Buildings and structures completed in 1911